Flavio Perlaza (born 7 October 1952) is an Ecuadorian footballer. He played in 24 matches for the Ecuador national football team from 1979 to 1985. He was also part of Ecuador's squad for the 1979 Copa América tournament.

References

External links
 

1952 births
Living people
Ecuadorian footballers
Ecuador international footballers
Association football defenders
Sportspeople from Esmeraldas, Ecuador